Popstars 2012, also known as Popstars goes Ibiza, is the tenth season of the German reality TV series Popstars, in which young and aspiring singers compete for a place in a new band.
Pre-castings for the show started in March 2012, where competitors were selected and called back to sing and perform in front of the jury. Casting was held in Berlin and the "workshop" started shooting in June on Ibiza. Online casting also took place, and one contestant reached the workshop stage in this way.

Changes 
During the casting stage, each jury member was able to give a contestant from zero to three points. To get into the re-call and later into the Workshop, the contestant had to earn eight points.

"Workshop"

During the Workshop phase, the point system continued. The groups are judged as one and needed to earn eight points to proceed into the next round. The groups which don't earn eight points must perform in a Survival Round, where they perform as a group or solo but get only judged as a solo contestant.

Episodes

Episode 01: Casting I 
Aired on 5 July 2012

Contestants proceeding to the Workshop: Alessio, Gianina, Scarlet and Züleyha.

Episode 02: Casting II 
Aired on 12 July 2012

Contestants proceeding to the Workshop: Viviana, Patrick and Chemseddin

Episode 03: Casting III 
Aired on 19 July 2012

Contestants proceeding to the Workshop: Joanna, Zerna, Alex, Cem and Fabian

Episode 04: Casting IV 
Aired on 26 July 2012

Contestants proceeding to the Workshop: Gaye, Steffi, Antonio, Katharina

Episode 05: Workshop I 
Aired on 2 August 2012

Additionally progressed to the Workshop: Marie, Alessandro, Mira

Retired after the Recall: Katharina

Winner of the Online Casting: Thuy

Guest star: Loreen

Group 1: Gianina, Alessandro, Zerna, Alex, Stephanie  -"Euphoria"

Group 2: Cem, Joanna, Marie, Fabian -"Turn This Club Around"

Group 3: Patrick, Scarlet, Antonio -"Sexy Chick"

Group 4: Thuy, Gaye, Züleyha, Vivianna -"You and I"

Group 5: Alessio, Chemseddin, Mira -"Turn Up The Music"

Survival round: Group 3 -"Can't Get You Out of My Head"

Eliminated: Antonio

Episode 06: Workshop II 
Aired on 9 August 2012

Guest Star: None

Group 1: Alex, Gianna, Gaye, Cem and Alessio -"I Won't Let You Go"

Group 2: Mira, Steffi, Chemssedin and Alessandro-"Firework"

Group 3: Joanna, Marie, Fabian, Zulehya and Patrick-"Ich laufe-Tim Bendzko"

Group 4: Zerna, Viviana, Scarlet and Thuy-"Jar of Hearts"

Survival round : Group 2 and Group 4

Eliminated: Announced in Episode 07

Episode 07: Workshop III 
Aired on 16 August 2012

In this episode the Survival round from the previous episode concluded. After that the contestants started to train for their next performance under the theme "Popstars Extravaganza". The episode finished without the contestants performing.

Guest Star: None

Survival round : Group 2 (Steffi, Chemssedin, Alessandro and Mira) and Group 4 (Viviana, Zerna, Thuy and Scarlet)

Eliminated: Alessandro, Zerna and Viviana.

Episode 08: Workshop IV 
Aired on 23 August 2012

This week the training for the Popstars Extravaganza show continued. After performing, the Jury decided that the "Too Close" group should go into the survival round.

Guest Star: None

Group 1: Gaye, Scarlet -"Tainted Love"

Group 2: Joanna, Steffi, Gianina and Zulehya -"S&M"

Group 3: Patrick, Alex and Mira -"Too Close"

Group 4: Alessio, Fabian, Chemssedin und Cem -"New Divide"

Survival round : Group 3

Retired: Marie (after illness) and Thuy (personal reasons)

Eliminated: Patrick

Episode 09: Workshop V 
Aired on 30 August 2012

The theme of this week's performance is "Cohesion" (Zusammenhalt).

Guest Star: None

Group 1: Cem, Mira and Chemssedin- "Rhythm Divine"

Group 2: Zulehya, Alessio and Gaye- "Das hat die welt noch nicht gesehen"

Group 3: Scarlet, Fabian and Joanna- "Little Talks"

Group 4: Alex, Gianina and Steffi- "The Flood"

Survival round : Group 3

Eliminated: Scarlet

Episode 10: Workshop VI 
Aired on 6 September 2012

This week the contestants are divided into four groups and each group will be coached by one Jury member and perform their currently favourite song. Beside that in the contestants will hold a pool party with a special guest, Paul van Dyk. He was responsible for choosing certain contestants to record a special version of his song "Such a Feeling (Verano)"

Guest Star: Paul van Dyk

Group 1: Alex, Alessio and Steffi (coached by Senna)- "Ain't Nobody"

Group 2: Gianina, Mira and Gaye (coached by D)- "Domino"

Group 3: Zulehya and Joanna (coached by Ross)- "Call Me Maybe"

Group 4: Cem, Chemssedin and Fabian (coached by Lucy)- "Set Fire to the Rain"

Survival round : Group 2 and Group 4

Eliminated: Gaye and Chemssedin

Episode 11: Workshop VII 
Aired on 13 September 2012

Guest Star: None

Group 1: Steffi, Cem and Alessio- "Scream"

Group 2: Alex, Zulehya and Fabian- "Shine On"

Group 3: Joanna, Mira and Gianina- "Forever"

Survival round : Group 2 and Group 3

Eliminated: Zulehya (all the girls from Group 3 advanced even when it was said that one member must leave from each survival group)

Episode 12: Final 
Aired on 20 September 2012

The New Band will consist of four members and they will be determined in four rounds.

The show opened with a medley of famous Popstars band songs "Hot Summer", "Do You" and "Daylight in Your Eyes".

Guest Stars: Loreen and Flo Rida

Flo Rida performed his hit Hit-Single "Whistle"

Band name: Melouria

The contestants could choose between three names, Mixtype, SoftRebel and Melouria

Round 1:

The male contestants performed "Schick mir ein engel" the first single from Season 3 winners Overground

The female contestants performed "No Smoke" from Season 7 winner band Queensberry

New Band Member : Alessio

Eliminated: Mira

Round 2:

The first group (Cem, Joanna and Steffi) performed an acoustic version of "Titanium".

The second group (Alex, Gianina and Fabian) performed "Bleeding Love".

New Band Members :Steffi

Eliminated: Fabian

Round 3:

The remaining four contestants performed "With a Little Help from My Friends" by The Beatles

New Band Members: Alex

Eliminated: Gianina

Round 4:

In this round the first three band members performed the first single "How Do You Do" with each remaining contestant and the viewers per tele-voting decided who will be the last band member.

New Band Member: Cem

Eliminated: Joanna

Popstars (German TV series)
2012 German television seasons